The Lash may refer to:

 The Lash (1916 film), a 1916 American silent film
 The Lash (1930 film), an American western film
 The Lash (1934 film), a British drama film
 Flagellation, a form of torture or punishment involving a whip

See also
 Lash (disambiguation)